Lee Joo-woo (born September 3, 1990) is a South Korean actress. She is known for her supporting role in the MBC's television series Return of Fortunate Bok (2017), which earned her a MBC Drama Award nomination.

Filmography

Films

Television series

Web series

Music video

Musical theater

Awards and nominations

References

External links
  at Echo Global Group 

 

1990 births
Living people
Baekseok Arts University alumni
21st-century South Korean actresses
South Korean television actresses
South Korean film actresses
South Korean musical theatre actresses